Harold Edwin Burrage (March 30, 1931 – November 26, 1966) was an American blues and soul singer, pianist, songwriter, and record producer.

Biography
Born in Chicago, Illinois, Burrage did session work as a pianist in the 1950s and 1960s as well as recording under his own name. He released singles on Decca, Aladdin, States, and Cobra in the 1950s, and for Vee-Jay and M-Pac in the 1960s. Burrage's backing bands included the likes of Otis Rush, Willie Dixon, Wayne Bennett, and Jody Williams, while Burrage supported Magic Sam, Charles Clark, and others as a pianist.

Burrage's first recording was "Hi-Yo Silver", written by Burrage and Claude Trenier, for Decca Records in 1950, backed by Horace Henderson's band.

Burrage's only national hit as singer was the 1965 Chicago soul song "Got to Find a Way", which reached number 31 on the US Billboard R&B chart. The following year Burrage died in Chicago, aged 35, from heart failure at the home of Tyrone Davis, a musician Burrage influenced.

Discography

From The Soul Discography

Additional recordings
Pioneer Of Chicago Soul, P-Vine Special PLP 9003 (1979)
Messed Up! The Cobra Recordings 1956-58, Westside WESM 634 (2001)

References

External links
 Harold Burrage Discography on Discogs

1931 births
1966 deaths
20th-century African-American male singers
American session musicians
American soul singers
Singers from Chicago
Cobra Records artists
Vee-Jay Records artists
Decca Records artists